Look Out! is an album by jazz saxophonist Stanley Turrentine featuring his earliest recordings as a leader on the Blue Note label performed by Turrentine with Horace Parlan, George Tucker and Al Harewood.

Reception
The Allmusic review by Steve Leggett awarded the album 4½ stars and states "Although he is best known for his bluesy soul-jazz outings, tenor saxophonist Stanley Turrentine's first Blue Note session as a leader was a much more traditional bop affair, and the resulting album... shows as much artful restraint as it does groove. Not that this is a bad thing, since it allows Turrentine's big, clear tone to shine through in all its muscular sweetness, giving Look Out! a wonderful and flowing coherence".

Track listing
All compositions by Stanley Turrentine except as indicated
 "Look Out" - 7:07
 "Journey into Melody" (Robert Farnon) - 4:52
 "Return Engagement" (Horace Parlan) - 4:40
 "Little Sheri" - 7:46
 "Tiny Capers" (Clifford Brown) - 4:56
 "Minor Chant" - 6:17
 "Little Sheri" [45 Version] - 5:36 Bonus track on CD
 "Tin Tin Deo" (Gil Fuller, Chano Pozo) - 6:15 Bonus track on CD
 "Yesterdays" (Jerome Kern, Otto Harbach) - 6:52 Bonus track on CD
Recorded at Van Gelder Studio, Englewood Cliffs, NJ on June 18, 1960.

Personnel
Stanley Turrentine - tenor saxophone
Horace Parlan - piano
George Tucker - bass
Al Harewood - drums

Production
 Alfred Lion - producer
 Reid Miles - design
 Rudy Van Gelder - engineer
 Francis Wolff - photography

References

Stanley Turrentine albums
Blue Note Records albums
Albums produced by Alfred Lion
1960 debut albums
Albums recorded at Van Gelder Studio